GT Cube is a racing video game sequel to GT Advance 3: Pro Concept Racing released in 2003 by MTO for GameCube.  The game was later re-released as GT Pro Series for Wii in 2006.

2003 video games
Japan-exclusive video games
GameCube-only games
Racing video games
GameCube games
Video games developed in Japan
Multiplayer and single-player video games
MTO (video game company) games